Battle of Bornos may refer to:

 Battle of Bornos (1811)
 Battle of Bornos (1812)